Veli Acar (born 30 August 1981) is a former Turkish professional footballer who played as a wingback.

Club career
Acar began his career in the amateur leagues with local club Karşıyakaspor. He played for several other Denizli-based clubs, including Denizli Telekomspor, Acipayam Merkezspor, and Pamukkale Üniversitesi G.S.K., before signing for Bursaspor in 2005. When he first signed with the club, they were competing in the TFF First League. Bursaspor earned promotion at the end of the season, with Acar making eleven appearances. His career with the club culminated with a Süper Lig title at the end of the 2009–10 season, the first in club history. Konyaspor signed him on 13 August 2010.

Honours 
Bursaspor
Süper Lig (1): 2009–10

References

External links

1981 births
Living people
Sportspeople from Denizli
Turkish footballers
Süper Lig players
Bursaspor footballers
Konyaspor footballers
Denizlispor footballers
TFF First League players
Association football defenders